Guysborough (population: 397) is an unincorporated Canadian community in Guysborough County, Nova Scotia.

Located on the western shore of Chedabucto Bay, fronting Guysborough Harbour, it is the administrative seat of the Guysborough municipal district. It is home to the Alder Grounds, Boggy Lake, Bonnett Lake Barrens, and Canso Coastal Barrens Wilderness Areas. The community is named after Sir Guy Carleton (Guy's borough).

History

The Mi'kmaq name for the village of Guysborough was Chedabuctou.

The Prince Henry Sinclair Society of North America believe he landed at Chedabucto Bay in 1398. The monument was erected on November 17, 1996. It is a fifteen-ton granite boulder with a black granite narrative plaque located at Halfway Cove on Trunk 16 in Guysborough County, Nova Scotia.

The village of Guysborough was first settled by French Europeans in 1634, led by Isaac de Razilly, a French nobleman and Navy officer who later became Governor of French Acadia. He built a fort named Fort St François à Canso at the entrance to the harbour. In 1655 Nicolas Denys, governor of the new St Lawrence Bay Province, built Fort Chedabuctou on Fort Point to serve as his capital. The fort was later replaced and renamed Fort St Louis.

In 1682, a permanent settlement was started by Clerbaud Bergier. A group cleared land and spent the winter with the first crops being planted in 1683. Louis-Alexandre des Friches de Meneval landed at Chedabouctou in 1687 when arriving to take up his position as governor of Acadia.

Claude Bergier led other merchants from La Rochelle, France in enjoying a fishing monopoly in Acadia.  In 1682, Fort St. Louis was established by the Company of Acadia (Compagnie de la Peche Sedentaire) to protect the fishery. The principal ports were at Chedabucto Bay, which accounted for fifty fishers in 1686. Dauphin de Montorgueil was the commandant at Fort Saint-Louis.

Raid on Chedabucto (1688) 
In 1687 there were 150 people at Chedabouctou, 80 of whom were fishermen. The Company of Acadia suffered heavy losses in 1688, when Chedabouctou was pillaged by New Englanders.

Battle at Chedabucto (1690) 

During King William's War, in 1690, Captain Cyprian Southack proceeded to Chedabucto to take Fort St. Louis which, unlike Port Royal, Nova Scotia, put up a fight before surrendering. As part of Sir William Phips's expedition to destroy the capital of Acadia Port Royal, Phips sent Southack to Chedabacto with 80 men to destroy Fort St. Louis and the surrounding French fishery. Meneval was stationed at the fort with 12 soldiers.  They tried to defend the fort for over six hours, until fire bombs burned the fort to the ground. Southack destroyed the enormous amount of 50,000 crowns of fish.

At the same time, Phips also dispatched Capt. John Alden who raid Cape Sable Island as well as the villages around the Bay of Fundy, particularly Grand Pre and Chignecto.

The Company of Acadia encountered a variety of difficulties on the way to its final disappearance in 1702.

Raid on Chedacacto (1718) - The Squirrel Affair 
Shortly after Southack established himself at Shelburne, Nova Scotia, the Mi'kmaq raided the station and burned it to the ground. In response, from 17–24 September 1718, Southack led a raid on Canso and Chedabucto (present-day community of Guysborough) in what became known as the Squirrel Affair. Southack laid siege for three days to Fort St. Louis at Chedabucto, which was defended primarily by Acadians. There were approximately 300 Acadians in the area. On board HMS Squirrel, Southack killed numerous Acadians and imprisoned others. On 18 September, British marines land on Lasconde's Grave and seize the entrance to Chedabucto Harbour. The following day HMS Squirrel landed troops at Salmon River who then proceeded to the rear of the village. HMS Squirrel made its first attempt to enter the harbour but was beaten back by the Acadian cannon fire from the fort. Later in the day the village was captured by the landed troops. On 20 September HMS Squirrel made a second attempt to enter the harbour. It successfully fired upon the fort. On 23 September Southack burned the village and loaded the goods on to the captured French transports. After pillaging and burning the villages, on 24 September, Southack released the Acadian prisoners onto the Canso Islands without any provisions or clothing. Others fled to Isle Madame. He seized two French ships, and encouraged the Governor of Nova Scotia, Richard Philipps, to fortify Canso.

French and Indian War 

The Acadians in this region left in the Acadian Exodus during Father Le Loutre's War.  Those that remained would have been removed during the French and Indian War.

American Revolution 
British settlers renamed the town Guysborough after Sir Guy Carleton, commander of the British forces and Governor General of British North America in the 1780s. After the American Revolution, led by Thomas Brownspriggs, Guysborough was settled by Black Loyalists and soldiers of the disbanded Duke of Cumberland's Regiment and King's Carolina Rangers.

One Black Loyalist was Hannah Lining (c. 1749 - ?).  She was a former slave of Dr. John Lining in Hillsborough, South Carolina (present-day Old Towne Creek).   She worked on his  plantation harvesting Indigofera.  In 1761, at age 22, she tried to make a run for freedom but was caught.  She lost one eye.  During the American Revolution, in 1780 the British officer Major General Leslie occupied John Lining's residence in Hillsborough and Hannah successfully escaped with her mother to New York. They worked in New York for a while before moving to Port Mouton, Nova Scotia.  Port Mouton burned down and she moved to Guysborough in 1784. Hannah was baptized in  1786 and married her first husband there the following year, when she age 38. Her first husband died. She remarried and then was windowed again.  Hannah did not have children. She was given land at near by Black Loyalist settlement Tracadie, Nova Scotia but never moved there. Hannah and her mother lived together into their old age.

Another Black Loyalist was Andrew Izard (c. 1755 - ?).  He was a former slave of Ralph Izard in Saint George, Dorchester, South Carolina.   He worked on a rice plantation and grew up on Combahee. When he was young he was valued at 100 pounds. In 1778 Izard made his escape.  During the American Revolution he worked for the British army in the wagonmaster-general’s department.  He was on one of the final ships to leave New York in 1783.  He traveled on the Nisbett in November, which sailed to Port Mouton. The village burned to the ground in the spring of 1784 and he was transported to Guysborough.  There he raised a family and still has descendants that live in the community.

In 1790 they built the first Anglican Church in the area and Rev. Peter de la Roche was the first minister.  He arrived from Lunenburg after having signed a ransom agreement with American privateers in the Raid on Lunenburg, Nova Scotia (1782).

Guysborough Blockhouse (1812–1815) was built to defend the town's harbour by the British during the War of 1812.

The town's fine natural harbour led to its establishment as the administrative centre for the county, and despite the diminishing role of the harbour for transport links, forestry, fishing and agriculture remain of great importance to the area.

St Ann's Catholic Church is the second church on the present site and was built in 1873.

Demographics 

Attractions
 The Old Guysborough Court House Museum (c. 1842 to 1843) is a Municipal Heritage Property under the Heritage Property Act.
 The former residence of Supreme Court of Nova Scotia Justice W.F. DesBarres.  The justice was the grandson of Joseph Frederick Wallet DesBarres who was an army officer, military engineer, surveyor, colonizer and colonial administrator who created an important 4-volume atlas of nautical charts for the coastline of eastern North America called the Atlantic Neptune.  The residence was renovated into the DesBarres Manor Inn in 2003. Several maps from the Atlantic Neptune hang in the inn.
 The Rare Bird Pub, The Skipping Stone Souvenir Store and Candlery, built in the 1920s and located on the scenic waterfront, were built from the old Jost Buildings. Frequented from their opening to the mid-1970s, the last of them, a general store, closed its doors in the early 1990s.

Legacy 
 namesake of HMCS Chedabucto (J168)

References

Sources
 
 
Haynes, Mark. The Forgotten Battle: A History of the Acadians of Canso/ Chedabuctou. British Columbia: Trafford. 2004
 

 
 John Webster. Chedabucto.

External links
Guysborough Journal
District of Guysborough

Communities in Guysborough County, Nova Scotia
Designated places in Nova Scotia